Shakti Dan Kaviya (17 July 1940 – 13 January 2021) was a poet, writer, critic, and scholar from Rajasthan, India. Kaviya had served as the department head of Hindi as well as Rajasthani section multiple times at Jai Narain Vyas University. He was considered an authority in Dingal (Rajasthani) literature as well as a great scholar of Hindi and Braj-Bhasha. Kaviya was also a Sahitya Akademi Award recipient for his work 'Dharti Ghani Rupali'

Early life and family 
Shakti Dan Kaviya was born on 17 July 1940 in Birai village of Jodhpur, Rajasthan. His father Govind Dan ji Kaviya was a scholar of Rajasthani (Dingal) and Braj literature.

His maternal uncle, Alseedan ji Ratnu was the Raj-Kavi (Poet-Laureate) of Jaisalmer state. In 1956, Shakti Dan was married to Leher Kanwar of Kharoda, Sindh. Kaviya has five sons:

 Virendra Kaviya
 Manjit Singh Kaviya
 Narpat Dan Kaviya
 Himmat Singh Kaviya
 Vasudev Kaviya

Education 

Kaviya's school education was completed in Balesar Government School and Mathania School. For the metric exam, he went to Chopasani school in Jodhpur. During his studies in Mathania School, he was a student under Padma-Shree Sita Ram Lalas, who went on to write the first dictionary of Rajasthani language, Rajasthani Sabadakos.

During his education in Jodhpur, Kaviya actively participated in social, literature, and debate events winning accolades for his performance. He took part in Rajasthani & Hindi poetry events as well as translation of English works into Rajasthani.

Even at this young age, Kaviya came in contact with important litterateurs and dignitaries. In 1951, when Kaviya was in fifth-standard, he started a correspondence with Shankar Dan Detha, Raj-Kavi (Poet-Laurette) of Limbdi(Kathiawar) State. In sixth standard of schooling, Kaviya published his composition dedicated to Hindu Goddess Karni Mata titled 'Shri Karni Yash Prakash' in Sadhna Press (Jodhpur). During his Bachelor of Arts studies in university, Kaviya translated the English poem Elegy by Thomas Grey into Rajasthani and wrote its meaning in Hindi. This Rajasthani rendering & the associated Hindi gist was published in the monthly Prerna magazine in its April edition in 1959.

Kaviya was the first student of SKS College (Jodhpur) whose poems and compositions were selected for regular broadcast in Akasvani (All India Radio) Jaipur. Later, he became an elected member of Akasvani Program Advisory Committee.

Kaviya was also active during India-China war of 1962 and his Dingal and Braj poems on the subject were regularly published.

In 1964, when Jai Narain Vyas University started publication of its Annual Magazine, Kaviya worked as Advisor of its Rajasthani section.

In 1969, Kaviya completed his Ph.D. from Jodhpur University over his research thesis on Dingal ke Aitihasik Prabhandha Kavya.

Career 
Kaviya joined Jai Narain Vyas University Jodhpur as a lecturer and was a part of the institution for 40 years. For 17 years, he taught as part of Hindi department and for 20 years, he taught in Rajasthani Department.

Kaviya was a great scholar of literature. His works focused on Rajasthani, Dingal, Hindi, and Braj literature. Kaviya served thrice as the Head of Department of Rajasthani at Jai Narain Vyas University, Jodhpur.

In 1974–75, the Rajasthani language was recognized by Sahitya Akademi & Jai Narain Vyas University launched the first-ever Rajasthani classes at the graduate level. Despite the low count of three students, Shakti Dan Kaviya accepted the responsibility of teaching the first batch and persuaded students to join the course, ultimately increasing the number of students to 19. He is credited as the first lecturer in the institution's history to teach Dingal Literature unviversity wide. During his tenure as Department Head of Rajasthani, JNVU University became the first in the world to offer MPhil course in Rajasthani language.

In 1993, Kaviya was awarded Sahitya Akademi Award for Dharti Ghani Rupali, which was a Rajasthani translation of 20 poems of Tarun Poetry by Rameshwar Lal Khandelwal.

Kaviya excelled at Dingal poetry and promoted it. He gave an introductory recital performance of Dingal poetry at Jaipur Literature Festival and was called "great maestro of Rajasthani Dingal poetry".

Academic usage of Kaviya's works

Rangbhini 
For the academic session 1976–77, Rangbhini by Shakti Dan Kavia was added to the official textbook for the second year syllabus of Bachelor of Arts studies.

Lokhini 
Lokhini by Shakti Dan Kavia, a collection of Rajasthani folk tales in Dingal language, was part of syllabus of M.A. Hindi for 2 academic sessions of 1964–65 and 1965–67. Later, it became a reference book for the subject.

Sanskriti ri Soram 
In 1986, Kaviya received the first Suryamal Misran Shikhar Award for the essay compilation titled Sanskriti ri Soram.  From 1993 to 2000, the work 'Sanskriti ri Soram' was part of official syllabus for the Rajasthani Optional paper in Maharshi Dayanand Saraswati University, Ajmer.

Dharti Ghani Rupali 
Kaviya received the Sahitya Akademi Award in 1993 for his poetry work titled Dharti Ghani Rupali.

Academic associations 

Kaviya was an award decision panel member of multiple literature associations including K. K. Birla Foundation(New Delhi), Sahitya Akademi(New Delhi), and Lakhotiya Awards (New Delhi).

Sahitya Akademi 
Due to his immense knowledge and contribution in Hindi, Rajasthani, and Braj literature, he had been a member of all three respective Sahitya Akademi(s) of Rajasthani, Hindi, and Brajbhasha.

Italy tour and Trieste University 
In 1987, Kaviya traveled to Italy for the International Literature Seminar as an expert on Dingal. The seminar lasted for 8 days where he brought attention to Dingal poetry. In Italy, Kaviya also gave a lecture on the 'Contribution of L.P. Tessitori in Rajasthani Literature'. At University of Trieste, Kaviya gave lectures on Dingal literature.

Death 
Kaviya died on 13 January 2021 at the age of 80. He had been unwell for the previous few days.

Scholars and littérateurs from all over Rajasthan paid their tributes including Aidan Singh Bhati, Gajadan Charan, Mohan Singh Ratnu, Minaxi Borana, Gajesingh Rajpurohit, Bhanwarlal Suthar, Sukhdev Rao, and Indra Dan Charan. Kaviya was equated with "Sun of Dingal language" at his passing due to his immense contribution for bringing Dingal language and literature to the next generation.

Significance 
Kaviya's research works have been translated & published in English, Italian, and Gujarati as well. He has been credited for voracious Dingal recitation in multiple documentaries and telefilms.

Awards and achievements 
Source:

 Rajasthan Sahitya Akademi, Udaipur: Rajasthani Padya Puraskar (1982) 
 Rajasthani Graduates Association Mumbai Puraskar (1984) 
 Bharatiya Bhasha Parishad Award (1985)
 Rajasthan Ratnakara, New Delhi: Mahendra Jajodiya Puraskar (1986)
 Suryamalla Mishran Shikhar Award (1986) 
 Maharana Mewar Foundation: Maharana Kumbha Award (1993) 
 Shri Dwarka Sevanidhi Trust, Jaipur: Rajasthani Puraskar (1993) 
 Sahitya Akademi Award for Translation for Rajasthani (1993) 
 Sahitya Samiti, Bisau: Rajasthani Sahitya Puraskar (1994) 
 Ghanashyamadas Saraf Sahitya Puraskar, Mumbai (2003)
 Fulchand Banthiya Puraskar, Bikaner (2003)
 Lakhotiya Puraskar, New Delhi (2005)
 Kamala Goenka Rajasthani Sahitya Puraskar, Mumbai (2005) 
 Kavi Shri Kag Bapu Lok Sahitya Award (2013) 
 Mahakavi Prithviraj Rathore Award (2013) 
 Rajasthan Braj Bhasha Academy Award

Published works

Rajasthani-language 

 Kaviyā, Śaktidāna (1984). Saṃskr̥ti rī Sorabha (in Hindi). Thaḷavaṭa Prakāśana.
 Sapootan ri Dharti सपूतां री धरती (काव्य-संग्रै)
 Kaviyā, Śaktidāna (2006). Dārū-dūshaṇa: Ḍiṅgaḷa śailī meṃ soraṭhābaddha kāvya (in Hindi). Ācārya Tulasī Rājasthānī Śodha Saṃsthāna. 
 Padma Shri Dr. Laxmikumari Chundawat (Biography) पद्मश्री डॉ. लक्ष्मीकुमारी चूंडावत (जीवनवृत्त)
 Dhara Surangi Dhat धरा सुरंगी धाट (काव्य-संग्रै)
 Dhoran ri Dharohar धोरां री धरोहर (काव्य-संग्रै)
 Prastavana ri Peeljol प्रस्तावना री पीलजोत (राजस्थानी निबंध)
 Eligi अेलीजी (अनुवाद)
 Dharti Ghani Rupali धरती घणी रुपाळी (पद्यानुवाद)
 Kaviyā, Śaktidāna (2014). Roonkh rasayan: poetry. Thalavaṭa Prakāśana.
 Sambodh Satsai संबोध सतसई
 Kaviyā, Śaktidāna (2014). Sonagira Sākau: Ḍiṅgala śailī meṃ aitihāsika kāvya (in Hindi). Thalavaṭa Prakāśana.
 Geet Gunmal गीत गुणमाल
 Durga Satsi दुर्गा सातसी

Hindi-language 
 Vārhaspatya, K., Kaviyā, Ś. (1979). Karaṇī Caritra. India: Śrī Karaṇī Sāhitya Saṃsthāna.
 Kaviyā, Śaktidāna (1984). Rājasthānī sāhitya kā anuśīlana (in Hindi). Thaḷavaṭa Prakāśana.
 Śrī Yaśakaraṇa Khiṛiyā: vyaktitva-kr̥titva-sr̥jana prakriyā aru Braja-racanā mādhurī saṅkalana (in Hindi). Rājasthāna Brajabhāshā Akādamī. 1992.
 Kaviyā, Śaktidāna (1997). Diṅgala ke aitihāsika prabandhakāvya, (Samvat 1700 se 2000 Vi.) (in Hindi). Scientific Publishers. . 
 Kaviyā, Śaktidāna (2004). Rājasthānī kāvya meṃ sāṃskr̥tika gaurava (in Hindi). Mahārājā Mānasiṃha Pustaka Prakāśa.

Editorship of historical works 

 Bārahaṭha, Kṛpārāma (1989). Rājiyā rā Soraṭhā. Rājasthānī Granthāgāra. 
 Ūmaradāna (1991). Umāradāna-Granthāvalī: janakavi Ūmaradāna kī jīvanī aura kāvya-kr̥tiyām̐ (in Hindi). Rājasthānī Granthāgāra.
 Kaviyā, Śaktidāna (1966). Kāvya-Kusuma: Rājasthānī kaviyoṃ ke piṅgala-kāvya kī eka jhalaka (in Hindi). Lakshmī Pustaka Bhaṇḍāra. 
 Kaviyā, Śaktidāna, and Cimanajī. Sōḍhāyaṇa: kavi kī anya racanāoṃ evaṃ vistr̥ta bhūmikā sahita. India, Sañcālaka, Rājasthāna Prācyavidyā Pratishṭhāna, 1966. 
 Kaviyā, Śaktidāna (1964). Lākhīṇī (in Hindi). Thalavaṭa Prakāśana. 
 Rangbhini (1965) रंगभीनी (संपादन-1965 ई.) 
 Darji Mayaram ri Vaat दरजी मयाराम री वात 
 Bāṅkidāsa, and Kaviyā, Śaktidāna. Kavi Mata Maṇḍaṇa: vistr̥ta jīvanī aura anya ajñāta racanāoṃ sahita. India, Jaina Brādarsa, 1983. 
 Ful Saru Pankhadi (1965) फूल सारू पांखड़ी (विविधा) 
 Kaviyā, Ś., Devaṛā, H. (1993). Bhagatī rī Bhāgīrathī. India: Rupama Sāhitya Saṃsthāna.
 Kavia, Shakti Dan (2000). Rajasthani Dooha Sangraha. Sahitya Akademi Publications. .
 Kaviya; S.D (1 January 2010). Man-Prakas. Scientific Publishers. .

Published Research Papers

Rajasthani

Hindi

Brajbhasha

References 

Charan
Indian poets
Rajasthani people
People from Rajasthan
Indian scholars
Indian educators
Dingal poets